Bold as Love is the debut album by Bardeux. During their short run as a group, Bardeux spun off both mainstream and dance hits. Their first single "Magic Carpet Ride" peaked at number #81 on the Billboard Hot 100 chart. Their third single and most notable song of their career was "When We Kiss," which peaked at #36 on the Hot 100. Their last single "Hold Me, Hold Me" didn't chart. The album peaked at number 104 on the Billboard 200. This is the only album upon which Lisa "Jaz" Teaney appeared.

Track listing
 "Magic Carpet Ride" (Acacia Smith, Jon St. James) 3:23
 "Three Time Lover" (St. James) 3:30
 "Caution" (Kim Allen Larson) 3:38
 "Bleeding Heart" (Karl Moet, Smith) 3:55
 "You're My Only Kind Of Lover" (Michael Stein) 3:46
 "Hold Me, Hold Me" (Kirk Fisher, Stein) 4:45
 "Dancing In The Wind" (Denise Batien, Gina Quartaro, Lisa Teaney, Moet) 4:31
 "Sex Machine" (Smith, St. James) 5:21
 "When We Kiss" (Smith, St. James) 4:52

Charts

References

1988 debut albums
Bardeux albums